Petros Christodoulidis, born March 4, 1975, in Greece, is the current bass player of the Power metal band Firewind. He has also played in Breaking Silence. He is the owner of Emerald Cafe, named after the Thin Lizzy song, in his home town, Thessaloniki.

Footnotes

Firewind members
1975 births
Living people
Heavy metal bass guitarists
Greek bass guitarists
Musicians from Thessaloniki
21st-century bass guitarists